The Breeders Crown 3YO Filly Trot is a harness racing event for two-year-old Standardbred female trotters. It is one part of the Breeders Crown annual series of twelve races for both Standardbred trotters and pacers. First run in 1984, it is contested over a distance of one mile. Race organizers have awarded the event to various racetracks across North America. The 2017 race will be held at Hoosier Park in Anderson, Indiana, United States.

Historical race events
In 1989, Peace Corps won this race in her age group, having already won the 1988 Breeders Crown 2YO Filly Trot in World Record time. She would go on to set another World Record in winning the 1990 Breeders Crown Open Mare Trot and then win that race again in 1992, making her the only horse in history to win four Breeders Crown races. 

In 2010, Pocono Downs became the first venue to host all 12 events on a single night.

North American Locations
Woodbine Racetrack (Wdb) Ontario (9)
Pompano Park (Ppk) Florida (7)
Meadowlands Racetrack (Mxx) New Jersey (6)
Mohawk Raceway (Moh) Ontario (3)
Pocono Downs (Pcd) Pennsylvania (2)
Rosecroft Raceway (Rcr) Maryland (2)
Colonial Downs (Cln) Virginia (1) 
Freehold Raceway (Fhl) New Jersey (1)
Garden State Park (Gsp) New Jersey (1)
Vernon Downs (Vdx) New York (1)

Records
 Most wins by a driver
 5 – Brian Sears (2003, 2004, 2005, 2009, 2013) 

 Most wins by a trainer
 3 – Per Henriksen (1993, 1999, 2007) & Trond Smedshammer (2003, 2004, 2005)

 Stakes record
 1:52.2 – Shake It Cerry (2014)

Winners of the Breeders Crown 3YO Filly Trot

External links
YouTube video of Peace Corps winning the 1989 3yo Breeders Crown

References

Recurring sporting events established in 1984
Harness racing in the United States
Harness racing in Canada
Harness races for three-year-old trotters
Horse races in Florida
Horse races in Maryland
Horse races in New Jersey
Horse races in New York (state)
Horse races in Ontario
Horse races in Pennsylvania
Horse races in Virginia
1984 establishments in North America